Computer hardware and software standards are technical standards instituted for compatibility and interoperability between software, systems, platforms and devices.

Hardware

Software

See also
List of RFCs
List of device bandwidths

References

Standards
 
Computer standards